The Gongna Beach defenses are a collection of World War II structures built on or near Gongna Beach (now also called Gun Beach) in Tamuning on the island of Guam, now a United States territory.  These defenses were erected by the Imperial Japanese Army during its occupation of the island 1941–44.  The three surviving elements were listed on the National Register of Historic Places in 1991.  They are located well north of the main Allied landing areas of the 1944 Battle of Guam.

Gun emplacement
The emplacement consists of two reinforced concrete walls flanking a Japanese 20 cm gun. From this position a covered way leads to a badly damaged pillbox structure, also made of reinforced concrete. At the time of its National Register listing, the pillbox was partially collapsed.

Gun mount

Pillbox
A circular concrete pillbox stands atop the berm overlooking the beach. It has a single opening, facing southwest, that is presumed to have acted as both access point and gun port.

See also
National Register of Historic Places listings in Guam

References

Buildings and structures on the National Register of Historic Places in Guam
World War II on the National Register of Historic Places in Guam
1940s establishments in Guam
1940s establishments in the Japanese colonial empire
Tumon, Guam
Beaches of Guam